Mangalagatti is a village in Dharwad district of Karnataka, India.

Demographics 
As of the 2011 Census of India there were 465 households in Mangalagatti and a total population of 1,972 consisting of 1,014 males and 958 females. There were 261 children ages 0-6.

References

Villages in Dharwad district